Ron Backes (born 19 February 1963 in St. Cloud, Minnesota) is an American retired shot putter.

His personal best throw was 21.02 metres, achieved in May 1988 in San Jose.

Achievements

References

1963 births
Living people
American male shot putters
Athletes (track and field) at the 1992 Summer Olympics
Olympic track and field athletes of the United States
Sportspeople from St. Cloud, Minnesota
Universiade medalists in athletics (track and field)
Universiade bronze medalists for the United States
Medalists at the 1987 Summer Universiade
20th-century American people
Competitors at the 1985 Summer Universiade